was a town located in Oda District, Okayama Prefecture, Japan.

As of 2003, the town had an estimated population of 5,421 and a density of 74.57 persons per km². The total area was 72.70 km².

On March 1, 2005, Bisei, along with the town of Yoshii (from Shitsuki District), was merged into the expanded city of Ibara.

Bisei was famous for the BAO, which stands for the Bisei Astronomical Observatory.

Dissolved municipalities of Okayama Prefecture